Linda Margaret Powell (born April 16, 1965) is an American actress.

Early life
Linda Margaret Powell was born in Fort Benning, Georgia, on April 16, 1965 the daughter of Alma and Colin Powell, the former United States Secretary of State, National Security Advisor and Chairman of the Joint Chiefs of Staff. She was raised on a series of military bases and attended four different high schools, because of her father's career. After attending Cheyenne Mountain High School in Colorado Springs, Colorado in eleventh grade, Powell graduated from Leavenworth High School in Leavenworth, Kansas in 1983. She graduated from the College of William and Mary in 1987 with a B.A. in English literature. Additionally, she studied theater at the Circle in the Square Theatre School.

Career
Powell has had a long career of supporting roles in film and television. Her most notable roles being Ingrid Mills on Chicago Fire, Pauline Samson in TV mini-series Political Animals and a lawyer in the film Blue Caprice.

Powell has also worked extensively in the theater, starring on Broadway in revivals of Wilder, Wilder, Wilder and On Golden Pond, and off Broadway in productions of A Raisin in the Sun, Angela’s Mixtape and The Christians.

Selected filmography

Film

Television

Awards and nominations

References

External links 
 

1965 births
20th-century American actresses
21st-century American actresses
Actresses from Georgia (U.S. state)
African-American actresses
American film actresses
American stage actresses
American television actresses
American actors of Jamaican descent
American people of Scottish descent
Circle in the Square Theatre School alumni
College of William & Mary alumni
Living people
People from Chattahoochee County, Georgia
People from Colorado Springs, Colorado
People from Leavenworth, Kansas
Colin L. Powell family